Gwen may refer to:

 Gwen (given name), including a list of people with the name
 Gwen, or the Book of Sand, a 1985 animated film
 Gwen (film), a 2018 horror film
 Tropical Storm Gwen, several storms with the name

Acronyms
 AN/URC-117 Ground Wave Emergency Network, a military command and control communications system
 Guild Wars: Eye of the North (GW:EN), an expansion pack for a massively multiplayer online role-playing game

See also 
 Gwendolen
 Gwendolyn (disambiguation)
 Gwenn